The Tres Marias red-tailed hawk (Buteo jamaicensis fumosus) is a relatively small subspecies of red-tailed hawk endemic to Islas Marías, an island some  off the coast of Mexico. Unlike some other island races, the validity of this race has rarely been called into question. This race is similar to the western red-tailed hawk (B. j. calurus) but, beyond being noticeably smaller, is duskier and duller hued overall and has a more cinnamon wash below, with heavily dark barred thighs.

References 

Tres Marias red-tailed hawk